Worlds Away is the debut studio album by Canadian new wave band Strange Advance, released November 1982. It featured two hit Canadian singles, "She Controls Me" and "Kiss in the Dark".  Strange Advance was subsequently nominated for a Juno Award for Most Promising Group of the Year in 1983.

The 7" single for "She Controls Me" contains a b-side track called "Lost in Your Eyes" which was later released on the Over 60 Minutes with... Strange Advance compilation.

Tomas Mureika of AllMusic calls this album one of Canada's most underrated new wave debut releases.

Four singles were released from this album, not including a dance mix of "Love Games" which was a club hit in England.

According to a 2000 e-mail exchange with keyboardist Drew Arnott, Worlds Away was performed with Yamaha CS-80, Roland Jupiter-8, and Mellotron M400 synthesizers.  Drums were performed with a Roland TR-808 augmented by live tom-toms and cymbals.

Track listing

Album credits

Personnel
Darryl Kromm - lead vocals, guitar
Drew Arnott - keyboards, drums, backing vocals, electronic percussion
Paul Iverson - bass, backing vocals
Robert Minden - waterphones

Production
Bruce Fairbairn - producer
Bob Rock - engineer
Lindsay Kidd - engineer

Footnotes

Citations

References

 Discogs.com - Worlds Away entry

1982 debut albums
Strange Advance albums
Capitol Records albums
Albums produced by Bruce Fairbairn